Razorbliss is the fifth studio album by German gothic metal band Flowing Tears, the third under the moniker of Flowing Tears. It is the band's first album with vocalist Helen Vogt.

Track listing

Lineup 

Helen Vogt – vocals
Benjamin Buss – guitars, keyboards, programming
Frederic Lesny – bass
Stefan Gemballa – drums

References

External links 
Razorbliss at Encyclopaedia Metallum
Flowing Tears Official Site

Flowing Tears albums
2004 albums
Century Media Records albums
Albums produced by Waldemar Sorychta